Susan is typically a feminine given name, from Persian "Susan" (lily flower), from Egyptian sšn and Coptic shoshen meaning "lotus flower", from Hebrew Shoshana meaning "lily" (in modern Hebrew this also means "rose" and a flower in general), from Greek Sousanna, from Latin Susanna, from Old French Susanne.

Variations
 Susana (given name), Susanna, Susannah
 Suzana, Suzanna, Suzannah
 Susann, Suzan, Suzann
 Susanne (given name), Suzanne
 Susanne (given name)
 Suzan (given name)
 Suzanne
 Suzette (given name)
 Suzy (given name)

Nicknames
Common nicknames for Susan include:
 Sue, Susie, Susi (German), Suzi, Suzy, Suzie, Suze, Poosan, Sanna, Suzie, Sookie, Sukie, Sukey, Subo, Suus (Dutch), Shanti

In other languages
  (Sousan, Susan)
  (Savsan),  (Sūsan)
  
  (Sawsan)
  (Šušan)
  (Sushan)
 Sujan in Korean (수잔)
 蘇珊 in Cantonese (Soshan)
 Suzanne in French 
 Susan in Dutch
 Susanne in German (also Susanna), Danish and Norwegian
  Shoshana (often shortened to  Shosh,  Shoshi)
 Shoshannam in Malayalam
 Zsuzsanna in Hungarian
 Susanna in Italian
  (Sūzan)
 Susanna, Sanna and Susanne in Swedish
 Zuzanna or Zane in Latvian
 Zuzana in Czech and Slovak
 Zuzanna in Polish
 Susana in Portuguese, Spanish, along with a newly invented form Azucena (the modern Spanish word for "lily")
 সুসান (Sausan) or সূজ়ন (Suzon) in Bengali
 Susanna in Catalan
 Suzana in Romanian
 Susanna in Estonian
 Сузана (Suzana) in Serbian
 Susen in Switzerland
 Сюзанна (Syuzanna) in Russian
 Σουζάνα (Souzana) or Σωσσάνα (Sosana) or Σουσάννα (Sousanna) in Greek
 ܫܘܫܢ or ܫܘܫܢܬ (Shushan or Shushaneh) in Assyrian/Chaldean/Aramaic/Syriac
 Suzan in Turkish
 Сусанна (Susanna) in Ukrainian
  (Kanul = Lotus) 
 Süsən in Azerbaijani
 ሶስና in Amharic
  Is actually composed of two word. Sy - eyes, and Zana - Goddess. It means Eyes of a Goddess. It is an original Albanian name. It is not related to Susan but it is common practice when translating books and TV shows to Albanian to convert Susan to Syzana.

See also
 List of people named Susan
 Black-eyed Susan (disambiguation)

References

External links

Etymology of Hebrew "shoshana" – basis of the name "Susan"

English feminine given names
Given names derived from plants or flowers
Persian feminine given names